Gerry Hundt (born May 29, 1977) is an American Chicago blues musician and multi-instrumentalist. His favoured instrument is the mandolin. Hundt released his debut solo album, Since Way Back, in early 2007.

Biography
Born in Appleton, Wisconsin, United States, Hundt's family relocated to Rockford, Illinois when he was aged three.

He has garnered respect for his work with other musicians such as John-Alex Mason and Nick Moss. This led to his 2007 solo album, Since Way Back, (on Blue Bella Records), which earned him nominations for the Blues Foundation's Blues Music Award for 'Best Instrumentalist, Other (mandolin)' in 2008, 2009, 2010, and 2011.

In 2015, Steadygroove Music released Gerry Hundt's Legendary One-Man-Band.

Discography
Since Way Back (2007)
Gerry Hundt's Legendary One-Man-Band (2015)

References

1977 births
Living people
American blues harmonica players
American blues singers
American multi-instrumentalists
Chicago blues musicians
American mandolinists
Singers from Illinois
People from Appleton, Wisconsin
Musicians from Rockford, Illinois
American blues guitarists
American male guitarists
American blues mandolinists
Guitarists from Illinois
21st-century American singers
21st-century American guitarists
21st-century American male singers